The Hi-Point Model CF-380 is a polymer-framed, semi-automatic, blowback-operated pistol manufactured by Hi-Point Firearms.
It is chambered in .380 ACP.

Design

The Model CF-380 is a compact, single stack magazine, derivative of Hi-Point's 9×19mm handgun line. It consists of a polymer
frame, zinc-alloy slide and bolt (with steel reinforcing inserts, and a steel breech, chamber and barrel. Its low price and small and compact design prompted many to purchase it for concealed carry.  Some decline to carry the CF-380 in Condition One ("cocked and locked" - generally considered to be the preferable condition for defensive carry) because its striker-fired design lacks a firing pin block.

Hi-point's handguns use a blowback design similar to that used in the Walther PPK and Russian Makarov PM. In blowback firearms the mass of the slide and bolt absorbs the rearward force generated by the propulsion of the bullet. As the pressure drops to a safe level, the slide moves back (along with the bolt), an extractor hooks the empty casing and pulls it out of the chamber, after which the case is ejected from the firearm by the ejector. When the slide has completed its rearward travel, the recoil spring moves the slide forward, chambering another round. Many, if not most,  modern handguns use a locked-breech design and therefore do not require the amount of slide mass that the blowback design requires in order to remain comfortable to shoot, safe to fire, and easy to control during the firing process.

Criticisms

The firing pin in this design also acts as the ejector. It is possible to have a 'out of battery detonation' while hand cycling live ammo through the gun due to this. This means that it is not safe to hand cycle live ammo through the gun and great care should be taken while unloading.

See also
 Hi-Point Firearms
 Hi-Point C-9 and C-9 Comp
 Hi-Point Model 40SW
 Hi-Point .45 ACP
 Hi-Point Carbine

References

Semi-automatic pistols of the United States
.380 ACP semi-automatic pistols